Dilara Bilge (born August 20, 1990) is a Turkish volleyball player. She is 195 cm and plays as opposite hitter.

She played for Galatasaray Medical Park before she was transferred by the Japanese club JT Marvelous in September 2013.

See also
 Turkish women in sports

References

1990 births
Living people
Turkish women's volleyball players
Galatasaray S.K. (women's volleyball) players
Turkish expatriate volleyball players
Turkish expatriate sportspeople in Japan
JT Marvelous players
20th-century Turkish sportswomen
21st-century Turkish sportswomen